The Anaesthete is the fourth full-length album by post-metal band Rosetta, and their first fully independent release. The album was announced on Rosetta's blog on June 20, 2013 and self-released as a download via Bandcamp on August 8, 2013 using the Pay what you want pricing system. CD and LP releases were issued by Debemur Morti in Europe and War Crime Recordings in North America. Pelagic Records reissued the album on both formats in 2018.

Track listing

Personnel
BJ McMurtrie – drums
Dave Grossman – bass, vocals
Matt Weed – guitar, piano, vocals
Mike Armine – vocals, electronics
Eric Jernigan - vocals on "Hodoku / Compassion"

References

2013 albums
Rosetta (band) albums
Self-released albums